Harvey Oliver Brooks (February 17, 1899 – June 17, 1968) was an American pianist and composer. He is the first black American to have written a complete score for a major motion picture: Mae West's film I'm No Angel (1933).

Career 
Brooks toured and recorded with Mamie Smith in the early-1920s, then settled in California. Beginning in 1923, he and Paul Howard co-led the Quality Four, a quartet with vocalist named after the Quality Cafe at 12th and Central in Los Angeles. Its members included Paul Howard on clarinet and tenor saxophone.

Brooks recorded with the Quality Four and Howard's Quality Serenaders. He remained a member of both until 1930. Brooks was the music director for Les Hite’s orchestra from 1931 to 1935. In this role, he worked for Hollywood film studios, composing soundtrack music. Brooks later worked as a leader of his own band, played in Kid Ory’s band (from 1952), and performed and recorded with Teddy Buckner (1955–1956) and Joe Darensbourg (1957–1960). Beginning 1961, he became a member of the Young Men of New Orleans (dixieland jazz group), which he led in the last year of his life.

In season three of the Netflix TV series Big Mouth, Brooks is shown mentoring a young Duke Ellington.

Selected discography 
 Paul Howard's Quality Serenaders, recorded in Culver City, California April 29, 1929
50877-1 – Stuff (stomp), Lionel Hampton (vocal), music by Brooks, Victor (V–38122–B)
 George Orendorff (trumpet), Lawrence Brown (trombone, arranger), Charlie Lawrence (clarinet, alto sax, arranger), Paul Howard (tenor sax, director), Harvey Brooks (piano), Thomas Valentine (banjo, guitar), James Jackson (tuba), Lionel Hampton (drums, vocal)

 Joe Darensbourg and his Dixie Flyers, recorded live at The Lark, Los Angeles, October 1957
 Live, American Music Records (1957) (re-released 1997) 
 Musicians: Mike Delay (trumpet), Warren Smith (trombone), Joe Darensbourg (clarinet, soprano sax, vocal), Harvey O. Brooks (piano), Al Morgan (bass), George Vann (drums, vocal), Richard Kenner (vocal)

Filmography 
I'm No Angel (1933)

 I Found A New Way To Go To Town (1933)
 music by Harvey O. Brooks
 lyrics by Gladys DuBois and Ben Ellison
 (uncredited)
 sung by Mae West
 I Want You, I Need You (1933)
 music by Harvey O. Brooks
 lyrics by Ben Ellison
 (uncredited)
 played on a piano and sung by Mae West
 I'm No Angel (1933)
 music by Harvey Brooks
 lyrics by Gladys DuBois and Ben Ellison
 (uncredited)
 sung by Mae West at the end and during the closing credits
 (No One Love Me Like) That Dallas Man (1933)
 music by Harvey O. Brooks
 lyrics by Gladys DuBois and Ben Ellison
 (uncredited)
 played on a record on which Mae West sings
 They Call Me Sister Honky Tonk (1933)
 music by Harvey O. Brooks
 lyrics by Gladys DuBois and Ben Ellison
 (uncredited)
 sung by Mae West
Dark Manhattan, with Ben Ellison

Other selected compositions 

 Blow, Man, Blow!
 words & music by Harvey O. Brooks & Ellis Lawrence Walsh
 Finger Wave (1936)
 music by Harvey O. Brooks
 It's A Mighty Pretty Night For Love
 music by Harvey O. Brooks
 A Little Bird Told Me (1947)
 music by Harvey O. Brooks
 see Federal court case over "covering"
 Love In The First Degree (1936)
 music by Harvey O. Brooks
 Shack In The Back (1936)
 music by Harvey O. Brooks
 That's The One For Me
 music by Harvey O. Brooks & Ellis Lawrence Walsh

References 

1899 births
1968 deaths
American jazz composers
American male jazz composers
American jazz pianists
American male pianists
American film score composers
American male film score composers
20th-century jazz composers
20th-century American pianists
20th-century American composers
20th-century American male musicians